Judolia japonica is a species of beetle in the family Cerambycidae. It was described by Tamanuki in 1942.

References

Judolia
Beetles described in 1942